David Stewart (1357 – c. 1386), Prince of Scotland, was a 14th-century Scottish magnate. He was the eldest son of the second marriage of King Robert II with Euphemia de Ross. King Robert, on 26 March 1371, the day of his coronation, created him Earl of Strathearn, and on the following day his son David performed homage to his father as of Earl of Strathearn.

On 19 June the same year he obtained a charter of the barony of Urquhart. He received the Castle of Braal in Caithness 21 March 1375, and he was also given the title Earl of Caithness between that date and 28 December 1377, when he was styled "Earl Palatine of Strathearn and Caithness".

He was involved in a major dispute with his older half-brother, Alexander Stewart, Earl of Buchan, who by 1385 had occupied his castle at Urquhart. It is uncertain, but it is highly likely that he died in March 1386, and no later than 1389. His wife appears to have been a daughter of Sir Alexander Lindsay of Glenesk, and sister of David Lindsay, 1st Earl of Crawford. They had a daughter, Euphemia, who succeeded to the earldom.  His widow married secondly Sir William Graham of Montrose, by whom she was the mother of his eldest son and heir Alexander Graham, esq., of Kincardine, father of the first Lord Graham.

Notes

References

 Paul, James Balfour, The Scots Peerage, Vols. II & VIII, (Edinburgh, 1909)
 Boardman, S. I., "Stewart, David, first earl of Strathearn and first earl of Caithness (b. in or after 1357?, d. 1386?)", Oxford Dictionary of National Biography, Oxford University Press, 2004 , accessed 21 May 2007
 John P. Ravilious, Sir William Graham and the Countess of Strathearn, The Scottish Genealogist (September 2011), Vol. LVIII, No. 3, pp. 112–116.

|-

1357 births
1380s deaths
Year of death uncertain
Stewart, David
David
Scottish princes
Earls of Caithness
14th-century Scottish earls
Sons of kings